Monsters in the Closet may refer to:
Monster in the Closet, a film
Monsters in the Closet (Mayday Parade album)
Monsters in the Closet (Swollen Members album)